Po Leung Kuk Ngan Po Ling College, often abbreviated as PLKNPLC or NPL, is a co-educational secondary school in Hong Kong.

The school was established by Po Leung Kuk and named after Po Leung Kuk director Madam  for her sponsorship. It is located at 26 , Hung Hom, Kowloon, Hong Kong.

It is the first Po Leung Kuk secondary school under the Direct Subsidy Scheme.

The school curriculum uses English as medium of instruction in all subjects with the exception of Chinese, Chinese History and other Chinese-related subjects, and French.

The school is providing both HKDSE and IB curriculums.

History 
The school was established by Po Leung Kuk in September 2003 and named after Po Leung Kuk director Madam Ngan Po Ling for her sponsorship. It is located at 26 Sung On Street, Hung Hom, Kowloon, Hong Kong.

Facilities 
The school is a Y2K school campus with an extra self-financed New Annex of 7,000 square meters. Other than standardized classrooms, special rooms and laboratories, the school provide spacious and decent school environment and state-of-the-art facilities which enhance all round and diversified education as well as effective learning.

Science Centre 
The Astronomy and Meteorology Science Centre is the cradle of science education. It is equipped with computer systems to control the telescope on the roof during star gazing activities. The Star Gazing Corner, with the largest refractors among all Hong Kong secondary schools, consists of two domes for observing planets and galaxies, providing opportunities for students to explore the outer space and widen their exposure. The school also hold regular astronomy seminars and workshops for the public. Equipped with advanced analytical research instruments such as Fourier-Transform Infrared Spectrometer (FTIR) and High Performance Liquid Chromatography (HPLC), the Chinese Medicine Research Centre is where the school's Chinese Medicine Research Team conducts research like Chinese medicine authentication and studies on the active ingredients in Chinese herbs.

Sports facilities 
The school's gym room is where students have their fitness programmes. School team members are especially trained up here on their muscular power. Some PE lessons would also take place in this room to help every student keep fit. The race track promotes the school's Athletics Team's on-campus training. It also further enhances the school's PE facilities, nurturing a healthy lifestyle for students. The indoor swimming pool well facilitates the school's PE curriculum and school team training. The pool is sterilized by Miox mixed oxidant disinfecting system which does not do harm on swimmers’ hair, eyes and skin. The newly installed drowning detection system Poseidon further enhances safety of swimmers. Together with the race track, the school's long jump pit promotes the school's Athletics Team's on-campus training. It also further enhances the school's PE facilities, nurturing a healthy lifestyle for students.

Others 
Students can make live broadcasts at the Campus TV Station, thereby developing their creativity, multimedia techniques and presentation skills. The school produces both English and Putonghua programmes. The conference room provides a venue for holding important meetings and receiving guests from the education circle and the community. This is also where the full-day programmes of the school's internal Model United Nations take place. Exchange Room is the school's Exchange Programme Centre which is the headquarter for multi-lateral cultural exchange activities. It is specially designed for exhibitions and receiving administrators, teachers and students from the school's overseas sister schools. Multipurpose Rooms are equipped with all necessary IT equipment to serve as a meeting hub allowing students, teachers, parents and educators to have professional exchanges. They also can be used for interview and meeting room for student leaders, teachers, parents and new students and small group teaching sessions and parents meetings. Furthermore, they can be used for counselling and personal growth workshops for small groups and individuals, as well as serving as a cosy space for student support work as well as a gathering place for Parent-Teacher Association (PTA). Teachers as well as social workers will arrange individual or small group consultation with students. PTA committee and volunteers may have causal gatherings and meetings. With comfortable seating accommodating around 90 students, the Lecture Theatre is where forums and debating competitions are held. The Mini Hall is a perfect venue for seminars, talks and mini-concerts. Besides the school's main hall, the New Era Hall is another important venue for large-scale activities from guest talks to assemblies. This is where students congregate to explore, experience and learn in a wider scale. The Orchestra Room is a perfect venue for playing Chinese and Western music. Various music teams can practise and develop their music talents while school teams can well prepare for performances and external competitions. At their student hostels, boarding facilities include a common area, a laundry room and a pantry, etc. Boarders can enjoy comfortable and quality accommodation with splendid sea views. Wardens are recruited on both floors to take care of students' everyday life and studies.

References
Information provided by the school website.

Secondary schools in Hong Kong
Hung Hom
Po Leung Kuk
Educational institutions established in 2003
Direct Subsidy Scheme schools
2003 establishments in Hong Kong